Minas de Oro is a municipality in the Honduran department of Comayagua.

Geography

Minas de Oro is located to the northeast of Comayagua, 150 km to the northwest of Tegucigalpa, the capital of Honduras. It is surround by the mountains named Grande, El Cobre and El Peñón. To the north, the district of Victoria; to the south, the San Luis and Esquías districts; to the east, the San Jose del Potero district and to the west, the La Libertad district.

Historical information
Minas de Oro was founded as a consequence of the gold rushes that were common in the region, when workers and neighbours settled in the area. During one of his visits to this place, Juan Lindo discovered a gold mine. For that reason it has continued to be called "Minas de Oro" (Gold Mines).

During Dr. Policarpo Bonillas's administration, citizenship began negotiating with the Círculo de Cabañas, an association that grouped the municipalities of Minas de Oro, Esquías and San José del Potrero. These negotiations led to the transfer of the head of such association to Minas de Oro in 1893, during general Domingo Vazquez's administration. To justify the transfer, the citizenship argued that the powerful increment of the footwear industry, the commercial relationship between Minas de Oro, Tegucigalpa and the northern coast, and the growing café crops in the region were becoming Minas de Oro's main patrimonies, which at least in the first case it held true in the subsequent years.

Education

City of education
In the 1990s, Minas de Oro was called a "city of education" in Honduras because it was the only municipality where all the towns had access to a primary education.

The Malcotal
Minas de Oro counted on the Malcotal School, oriented to the agroforestal formation led by a North American. The only thing left of this institution is a house turned centre of tourist retirements in the highway that leads to Mines of San Antonio.

Evangelical Boarding School
Minas de Oro were counted by the decade from the 1960s to 1990s in the Famous Evangelical Institute that has a boarding school where students from all of the republic of Honduras went. Its musical, English formation and Biblical education was recognised. At the beginning of the 1960s, it closed because of stoked heat from the insecurity in the access routes, stop cost of fuels, local competition, and complexity in the administrative handling of this type of institution.

Minas de Oro Regional Institute

List of villages
031101 Minas de Oro
031102 Agua Blanca
031103 El Socorro
031104 El Zompopero
031105 La Hoya de la Puerta
031106 Las Huertas
031107 Minas de San Antonio
031108 Montecitos
031109 Pimientilla
031110 San Isidro del Mal Paso
031111 Santa Cruz

List of

Notable people
Neida Sandoval – A host of the morning show Despierta America on the Spanish language network Univision.
Vicente Cáceres – teacher in one of the largest public schools of Honduras.
Ramón Carías Donaire – teacher, principal of the Villa Ahumada Normal School.
José María Calix – journalist

Sites of interest
Cerro Pelon – A mountain to the north of the city that is named after its lack of large trees. Only desert plants like cacti, small palms and bushes grow. There are also many caves that make popular tourist attractions. This site is also known as Cerro Grande (Large Hill) or Cacalotepe in some geography books. Over the top there is a point of the first order geodetic net.
Evangelical Institute installations
El Malcotal installations
El Manantial Ecocenter
Cerro Los Tornillos
Some closed mines

References

External links
 Minas de Oro website

Municipalities of the Comayagua Department